Jin-wook is a Korean masculine given name.

People with this name include:
Kang Jin-wook (born 1986), South Korean footballer 
Kim Jin-wook (born 1960), South Korean baseball manager
Lee Jin-wook (born 1981), South Korean actor
Suk Jin-wook (born 1976), South Korean volleyball player

Fictional characters with this name include:
Choi Jin-wook, in 2011 South Korean television series Baby Faced Beauty
Han Jin-wook, in 2013 South Korean television series Good Doctor
Seo Jin-wook, in 2013 South Korean television series You're the Best, Lee Soon-shin

See also
List of Korean given names

Korean masculine given names